Nadirabad (also romanized as Nadīrābād; also known as Kadrabad, Nāderābād, Nadīsābād, and Nadrābād) is a village in Soltaniyeh Rural District, Soltaniyeh District, Abhar County, Zanjan Province, Iran. At the 2006 census, its population was 37, in 7 families.

References 

Populated places in Abhar County